CCGS Provo Wallis is a  that served with the Canadian Coast Guard. The vessel entered service in 1969 and was classed as a Medium-endurance Multi-tasked Vessel. Provo Wallis spent the majority of her career on the Atlantic Coast of Canada before transferring to the West Coast. Ice-strengthened, the ship was used mainly for maintaining navaids in shipping lanes. The vessel was taken out of service in 2011 and laid up.

Design and description
Provo Wallis had an initial gross register tonnage (GRT) of 1,317. The ship was initially powered by two National Gas 6-cylinder geared diesel engines driving two controllable-pitch propellers, creating .

The vessel's was remeasured to 1,462 gross tonnage (GT). Other changes during the modernization were the installation of new equipment and improving accommodation. The buoy tender had a complement of 24.

Service history
The ship was constructed by Marine Industries at their yard in Sorel, Quebec and was commissioned in October 1969. The ship was named in honour of Provo Wallis, a native of Halifax, Nova Scotia. Wallis was appointed Admiral of the fleet in the Royal Navy on 11 December 1877; the highest rank in the Royal Navy. The ship was registered in Ottawa, Ontario. The homeport of Provo Wallis was CCG Base Saint John in Saint John, New Brunswick.

In 1990, the vessel underwent a major refit at Marystown Shipyard in Marystown, Newfoundland and Labrador a new derrick installed, and other modernizations. In 2003 CCGS Provo Wallis was placed in cold lay-up/mothballed at CCG Base Dartmouth but was reactivated in 2006 and sailed to British Columbia where she replaced her sister ship Bartlett which was placed in cold lay-up until refit in 2010.

Upon completion of the refit for CCGS Bartlett in 2010, CCGS Provo Wallis was declared surplus and decommissioned. The ship was renamed 2011-02 by the Department of Fisheries and Oceans and was listed for sale in 2013. The ship was purchased by J. Beaulieu in 2013.

Notes

Citations

Sources
 
 
 

Provo Wallis-class navaids tenders
Ships built in Quebec
1969 ships
Navaids tenders of the Canadian Coast Guard